Epocilla aurantiaca is a species of jumping spider found from India to Malaysia.

References

Further reading 
Proszynski, J. (1997). Salticidae: Diagnostic Drawings Library

Arthropods of India
Invertebrates of Malaysia
Spiders of Asia
Salticidae
Spiders described in 1885